Bruce Beaton (born June 13, 1968 in Port Hood, Nova Scotia) is a former professional Canadian football offensive lineman who played 13 seasons in the Canadian Football League for five different teams. He was named CFL All-Star three times and was a part of two Grey Cup championship teams with the Edmonton Eskimos. Beaton played college football at Acadia University.

External links
 http://www.oursportscentral.com/services/releases/?id=3037485

1968 births
Living people
Acadia Axemen football players
BC Lions players
Calgary Stampeders players
Canadian football offensive linemen
Edmonton Elks players
Montreal Alouettes players
Ottawa Rough Riders players
People from Inverness County, Nova Scotia
Players of Canadian football from Nova Scotia